Falmouth and Camborne was, from 1950 until 2010, a county constituency represented in the House of Commons of the Parliament of the United Kingdom. It elected one Member of Parliament (MP) by the first past the post system of election.

History
The Falmouth and Camborne seat was created in 1950, succeeding the former Camborne constituency.  The seat had an industrial tradition, mostly in tin mining.  The seat alternated between the Labour and Conservative parties until 2005, when it was won by Julia Goldsworthy of the Liberal Democrats.

The former gold medal-winning athlete Sebastian Coe represented this seat as a Conservative from 1992 until his defeat by Labour in 1997.

Boundaries
1950–1983: The Municipal Boroughs of Falmouth and Penryn, the Urban District of Camborne-Redruth, and parts of the Rural Districts of Kerrier, Truro, and West Penwith.

1983–1997: The District of Kerrier wards of Camborne North, Camborne South, Camborne West, Constantine, Illogan North, Illogan South, Mabe and St Gluvias, Mawnan and Budock, Redruth North, Redruth South, St Day and Lanner, and Stithians, and the District of Carrick wards of Arwenack, Mylor, Penryn, Penwerris, Smithick, and Trevethan.

1997–2010: The District of Kerrier wards of Camborne North, Camborne South, Camborne West, Constantine and Gweek, Illogan North, Illogan South, Mabe and St Gluvias, Mawnan and Budock, Redruth North, Redruth South, St Day and Lanner, and Stithians, and the District of Carrick wards of Arwenack, Mylor, Penryn, Penwerris, Smithick, and Trevethan.

Boundary changes
Following its review of parliamentary representation in Cornwall, the Boundary Commission for England abolished this constituency at the 2010 general election.  The new Camborne and Redruth seat took most of the electoral wards from this seat, while the remaining wards form part of the new Truro and Falmouth constituency.

Members of Parliament

Elections

Elections in the 1950s

Elections in the 1960s

Elections in the 1970s

Elections in the 1980s

Elections in the 1990s

Elections in the 2000s

References

Constituencies of the Parliament of the United Kingdom established in 1950
Constituencies of the Parliament of the United Kingdom disestablished in 2010
Falmouth, Cornwall
Parliamentary constituencies in Cornwall (historic)
Camborne